Long Glacier is a glacier about  long in the southeastern part of Thurston Island, Antarctica. The glacier was mapped by the United States Geological Survey from surveys and U.S. Navy air photos, 1960–66, and was named by the Advisory Committee on Antarctic Names (US-ACAN) for Fred A. Long, Jr., an aviation machinist of U.S. Navy Squadron VX-6, who wintered at Little America V in 1957 and was in Antarctica in the 1960–61 and 1962–63 seasons.

Long Bluff is a conspicuous rock bluff on the west side of Long Glacier. It was named by US-ACAN after W.A. Long, Chief Pharmacist's Mate in the Eastern Group of U.S. Navy Operation Highjump, 1946–47. Assigned to the January 11, 1947 search flight commanded by Lieutenant James L. Ball, Long was the first to sight the wreck of PBM Mariner seaplane George One on Noville Peninsula, leading to the rescue of its survivors.

See also
 List of glaciers in the Antarctic
 Glaciology

Maps
 Thurston Island – Jones Mountains. 1:500000 Antarctica Sketch Map. US Geological Survey, 1967.
 Antarctic Digital Database (ADD). Scale 1:250000 topographic map of Antarctica. Scientific Committee on Antarctic Research (SCAR), 1993–2016.

References

 

Glaciers of Thurston Island